Arthur James Williams (born November 12, 1964) is an American former professional boxer who competed between 1989 and 2010. He held the IBF cruiserweight title from 1998 to 1999 and challenged twice for the WBA cruiserweight title in 1994.

Professional career

Williams became professional in 1989 and fell short in his first shot at a major championship title, a 1994 split-decision loss to Orlin Norris for the World Boxing Association Cruiserweight Title.  Williams was knocked out in the third round in a rematch with Norris later that year.  It was not until 1998 that Williams got another shot at a title belt, a 1998 bout with Imamu Mayfield for the International Boxing Federation Cruiserweight Title.

Professional boxing record

See also
List of world cruiserweight boxing champions

References

External links

 

  

1964 births
Living people
Boxers from Florida
American male boxers
African-American boxers
21st-century African-American people
20th-century African-American sportspeople
Sportspeople from Pensacola, Florida
Cruiserweight boxers
World cruiserweight boxing champions
International Boxing Federation champions